Rebecca Scherm is an American author. She published her first novel, Unbecoming, in 2015. She received her MFA from the University of Michigan. She is currently working on a second novel, Beta.

References

Year of birth missing (living people)
Living people
American women novelists
21st-century American novelists
University of Michigan alumni
21st-century American women writers
21st-century American short story writers